Karl Werner Cajanus (1878–1919) was a Finnish forest scientist. He taught philosophy as a doctorate in 1914 and cared for at the University of Helsinki the evaluation of forest professions in 1909–1918. Thereafter, he was in 1918–1919 as Secretary of State in Stockholm and as Chargé d'Affaires in Copenhagen .

References 

Finnish foresters
Academic staff of the University of Helsinki
Finnish diplomats
1878 births
1919 deaths